Keith McCambridge (born February 1, 1974) is a Canadian professional ice hockey coach and a former defenceman. He was previously the head coach of the American Hockey League's Manitoba Moose/St. John's IceCaps team from 2011 to 2016 and the Hartford Wolf Pack from 2017 to 2019.

Playing career
McCambridge was born in Thompson, Manitoba, but grew up in Selkirk. He joined the Selkirk Steelers of the Manitoba Junior Hockey League as a 16-year-old, playing one season before moving on to the Swift Current Broncos of the Western Hockey League, where he spent most of his major junior career. During his final season of junior hockey, McCambridge was traded to the Kamloops Blazers, joining them on their 1995 Memorial Cup championship run.

McCambridge was drafted in the eighth round, 201st overall by the Calgary Flames in the 1994 NHL Entry Draft. After junior, he spent three seasons with the Saint John Flames, Calgary's AHL affiliate, from 1995 to 1998. He later went on to play for several teams in both the American and the International Hockey Leagues, including the Las Vegas Thunder, Providence Bruins, Long Beach Ice Dogs, and Cleveland Barons. Known for his tough, bruising style of play, McCambridge recorded 42 points and 1333 penalty minutes in 461 regular season games, AHL and IHL combined.  He also played in 40 playoff games.

In 2003, McCambridge signed as a player-coach with the Alaska Aces of the ECHL. He spent three seasons with the Aces, as a captain wearing the number 2, and was a part of their 2006 Kelly Cup championship team. McCambridge retired as a player following the Aces' championship season.

Coaching career
After retiring a player, McCambridge became a full-time assistant coach for Aces in 2006 and was promoted to head coach a year later. The Aces enjoyed two successful seasons under McCambridge's guidance and advanced to the finals in 2008-2009.

In 2009, McCambridge joined the American Hockey League's Manitoba Moose as an assistant coach and later moved with the team to St. John's, Newfoundland and Labrador in 2011. The Winnipeg Jets, the parent club of the St. John's IceCaps, subsequently selected McCambridge to replace Claude Noël as head coach. McCambridge led the IceCaps to a division title in 2011–12 and a berth in the 2014 Calder Cup finals, which they lost to the Texas Stars in five games.

McCambridge was retained as head coach when the franchise relocated back to Winnipeg as the Moose in 2015. After one season back in Manitoba, McCambridge's contract was not renewed by the Jets' organization. He was hired as an assistant coach by the Hartford Wolf Pack in August 2016.

On June 12, 2017, McCambridge was named Wolf Pack head coach for the 2017–18 AHL season. He was fired after two seasons. 

McCambridge was hired as an Associate Coach by the Vancouver Giants of the WHL in 2020 and served in that capacity for two seasons.  He has been hired by the Bakersfield Condors of the American Hockey League as an Assistant Coach.

Career statistics

Coaching record

References

External links

1974 births
Living people
Alaska Aces (ECHL) players
Calgary Flames draft picks
Canadian ice hockey defencemen
Cleveland Barons (2001–2006) players
ECHL coaches
Houston Aeros (1994–2013) players
Ice hockey people from Manitoba
Kamloops Blazers players
Las Vegas Thunder players
Long Beach Ice Dogs (IHL) players
Manitoba Moose (IHL) players
Manitoba Moose coaches
People from Thompson, Manitoba
Providence Bruins players
Saint John Flames players
St. John's IceCaps coaches
Selkirk Steelers players
Swift Current Broncos players
Canadian ice hockey coaches